Sultan Salahuddin Abdul Aziz Shah Al-Haj ibni Almarhum Sultan Hisamuddin Alam Shah Al-Haj (8 March 1926 – 21 November 2001) was the 11th Yang di-Pertuan Agong of Malaysia and eighth Sultan of Selangor.

Early life
Born on at 3:30 pm. Tengku Abdul Aziz Shah on Monday 8 March 1926 at Istana Bandar Temasha, Jugra, Kuala Langat, he is the eldest son of Sultan Hisamuddin Alam Shah Al-Haj ibni Almarhum Sultan Alauddin Sulaiman Shah by his royal consort and wife, Tengku Ampuan Raja Jemaah binti Al-Marhum Raja Ahmad.

He received his early education at the Pengkalan Batu Malay School in Klang in 1934. In 1936, he furthered his studies at the Malay College Kuala Kangsar until 1941 when World War II began. After World War II, he went to England in 1947 and studied at the School of Oriental and African Studies, University of London for two years.

Upon his return from the United Kingdom, he served with the Civil Service Department as a Trainee Officer with the Selangor Survey Department. He later served as an Inspector of Schools for eight years.

In 1952, he attended a short-term course at the Malay Military Troop in Port Dickson for six months and was commissioned with the Queen Commission in the rank of captain. Thereafter, he was promoted to the rank of major.

Sultan of Selangor

Sultan Salahuddin Abdul Aziz Shah was appointed as the Tengku Laksamana of Selangor on 1 August 1946 and as the Raja Muda (Crown Prince) of Selangor on 13 May 1950.

On the demise of his father, Sultan Hisamuddin Alam Shah Al-Haj ibni Almarhum Sultan Alaeddin Sulaiman Shah, Tengku Abdul Aziz Shah became the eighth Sultan of Selangor with the title Sultan Salahuddin Abdul Aziz Shah on 3 September 1960 and was installed as the 8th Sultan on 28 June 1961.

On 26 April 1984, Sultan Salahuddin Abdul Aziz Shah was appointed as Commodore-in-Chief of the Royal Malaysian Navy by the Malaysian Armed Forces in place of the position of Colonel-in-Chief of the Royal Malaysian Air Force which he held since 1966.

Sultan Salahuddin was the Sultan who signed the cession of Kuala Lumpur from Selangor to the Federal Government to form a Federal Territory on 1 February 1974. The Sultan cried after the signing as he was very fond and proud of the city, but he did it for the greater good of Malaysia. The Kota Darul Ehsan arch was erected along the Federal Highway at the border of Kuala Lumpur and Selangor to commemorate the event in 1981.

Sultan Salahuddin was a founder of Shah Alam, the new Selangor state capital in 1978. He said that for Selangor to become a modern state, it would need a new state capital as Kuala Lumpur had become a Federal Territory. At that time Klang was the state capital after the cession of Kuala Lumpur when the Sultan founded Shah Alam. Many buildings and roads in Shah Alam are named after him.

Salahuddin held the rank of Marshal of the Royal Malaysian Air Force, Field Marshal of the Malaysian Army and Admiral of the Fleet of the Royal Malaysian Navy as per constitutional provisions making him as the second royal military officer to become supreme commander-in-chief of the armed forces.

Yang di-Pertuan Agong
He was the second oldest ruler to be elected as the eleventh Yang di-Pertuan Agong on 26 April 1999 and installed on 11 September 1999.

The cession of Putrajaya, which was formerly Selangor territory, to the Federal Government in 2001 to become a Federal Territory occurred during his reign as Yang di-Pertuan Agong. The Persiaran Sultan Salahuddin Abdul Aziz Shah in Putrajaya was named after him.

However, after reigning for two years and 6 months, he died in office on 21 November 2001 at the Gleneagles Intan Medical Centre in Kuala Lumpur. He underwent a heart operation to put a pacemaker two months prior to his death, which he did not fully recover from. He was buried in the Royal Mausoleum near Sultan Sulaiman Mosque in Klang.

Personal life
Sultan Salahuddin Abdul Aziz Shah married at least four wives.

His first wife and cousin, HRH Paduka Bonda Raja Raja Nur Saidatul Ihsan binti Al Marhum Raja Bendahara Tengku Badar Shah, whom he later divorced, bore:
 Tengku Nor Halija
 Tengku Idris Shah, later Sultan Sharafuddin Idris Shah
 Tengku Puteri Sofiah (died 8 June 2017)
 Tengku Laksamana Tengku Sulaiman Shah
 Tengku Puteri Zahariah (Ku Yah)
 Tengku Fatimah
 Tengku Panglima Besar Tengku Abdul Samad
 Tengku Puteri Arafiah
 Tengku Puteri Aishah (died 30 July 2012)

Che Maheram binti Muhammad Rais, his second wife, bore him:
 Tengku Panglima Raja Tengku Ahmad Shah

His royal consort, Tengku Ampuan Rahimah binti Sultan Abdul Aziz Shah of the Langkat royal family in Sumatra died in 1993 before his election as Yang di-Pertuan Agong. She was the mother of:
 Tengku Puteri Nor Marina
 Tengku Puteri Nor Zehan

His last wife, commoner Tuanku Siti Aishah binti Abdul Rahman, served as his Raja Permaisuri Agong. Being fifty years younger than him, she was also the youngest ever occupant of that office – only 29 at her succession to the throne.

Hobbies and interests
Sultan Salahuddin Abdul Aziz Shah was a keen sportsman. His interest in golf is well-known within and outside the country. The Sultan also loved sailing, collecting antique cars, rearing animals and planting orchids. He also likes visiting foreign countries to widen his knowledge and experience.

Legacy

Several projects and institutions were named after the Sultan, including:

Educational institutions
 SMK Sultan Salahuddin Abdul Aziz Shah, a secondary school in Shah Alam, Selangor
 SMK Sultan Abdul Aziz Shah, a secondary school in Kajang, Selangor
 SAMT Sultan Salahuddin Abdul Aziz Shah, a secondary school in Sabak, Selangor
 Politeknik Sultan Salahuddin Abdul Aziz Shah in Shah Alam, Selangor

Buildings
 Sultan Salahuddin Abdul Aziz Shah Building, Selangor's state secretariat building in Shah Alam, Selangor
 Sultan Salahuddin Abdul Aziz Shah Mosque, Selangor's state mosque in Shah Alam, Selangor
 Sultan Salahuddin Abdul Aziz Shah Court Building, a court building in Shah Alam, Selangor
 Sultan Abdul Aziz Shah Jamek Mosque, a mosque in Petaling Jaya, Selangor
 Sultan Abdul Aziz Shah Airport, an airport in Subang, Selangor
 KD Sultan Abdul Aziz Shah, a TLDM naval base in Pulau Indah, Klang, Selangor
 Sultan Salahuddin Abdul Aziz Power Station, a power station in Kapar, Selangor
 Sultan Salahuddin Abdul Aziz Shah Arts and Cultural Centre at Universiti Putra Malaysia (UPM) in Serdang, Selangor

Roads and bridges
 Persiaran Sultan Salahuddin Abdul Aziz Shah, a main thoroughfare in Putrajaya
 Jalan Sultan Salahuddin and Persiaran Sultan Salahuddin, a major road in Kuala Lumpur
 Jalan Raja Muda Abdul Aziz, a major road in Kuala Lumpur
 Sultan Salahuddin Abdul Aziz Shah Bridge, a bridge in Kuala Selangor

Others
 Sultan Abdul Aziz Shah Golf and Country Club (KGSAAS), a major golf club in Shah Alam, Selangor
 Sultan Abdul Aziz Royal Gallery, a royal gallery located in Klang, Selangor

Honours 

Salahuddin's full style and title was: Duli Yang Maha Mulia Sultan Salahuddin Abdul Aziz Shah Alhaj ibni Almarhum Sultan Hisamuddin Alam Shah Alhaj, Sultan dan Yang di-Pertuan Selangor Darul Ehsan Serta Segala Daerah Takluknya.

Honours of Selangor 
  Grand Master of the Royal Family Order of Selangor (since 6 June 1961)
  Grand Master of the Order of the Crown of Selangor (since 6 June 1961)
  Grand Master of the Order of Sultan Salahuddin Abdul Aziz Shah (since 30 September 1985)
  Meritorious Service Medal

Honours of Malaysia 
  (as Yang di-Pertuan Agong from 26 April 1999 to 21 November 2001) : 
  Grand Master and recipient of the Order of the Royal House of Malaysia (26 April 1999 – 21 November 2001)
  Grand Master and recipient of the Order of the Crown of the Realm (28 August 1961) (26 April 1999 – 21 November 2001)
  Grand Master of the Order of the Defender of the Realm (26 April 1999 – 21 November 2001)
  Grand Master of the Order of Loyalty to the Crown of Malaysia (26 April 1999 – 21 November 2001)
  Grand Master of the Order of Merit of Malaysia (26 April 1999 – 21 November 2001)
  Grand Master of the Order for Important Services (Malaysia) (26 April 1999 – 21 November 2001)
  Grand Master of the Order of the Royal Household of Malaysia (26 April 1999 – 21 November 2001)
  : 
  Member 1st class of the Family Order of the Crown of Indra of Pahang (DK I) (14 July 1987)
  : 
  First Class of the Royal Family Order of Johor (DK I) (1975)
  : 
  Member of the Royal Family Order of Kedah (DK) 
  : 
  Recipient of the Royal Family Order or Star of Yunus (DK) (10 July 1966)
  : 
  Member of the Royal Family Order of Negeri Sembilan (DKNS)
  : 
  Recipient of the Royal Family Order of Perak (DK) – currently :  (19 April 1986)
  : 
  Recipient of the Perlis Family Order of the Gallant Prince Syed Putra Jamalullail (DK)
  : 
  Member first class of the Family Order of Terengganu (DK I) (21 June 1964)
  : 
  Grand Commander of the Order of Kinabalu (SPDK) – Datuk Seri Panglima
  :
  Knight Grand Commander of the Order of the Star of Hornbill Sarawak (DP) – Datuk Patinggi (29 April 1976)
  :
  Grand Commander of the Premier and Exalted Order of Malacca (DUNM) – Datuk Seri Utama (1 August 1987)

Foreign honours 
  : Royal Family Order of the Crown of Brunei (DKMB) (28 June 1961)
  : Al Khalifah Medal Decoration (28 October 2000)
  : Grand Collar of the Order of Boyaca 
  : Knight of the Order of the Rajamitrabhorn (2001)

References
 Alagappa, Muthiah, Coercion and Governance: The Declining Political Role of the Military in Asia, Stanford University Press, 2001, 
 Information Malaysia, Berita Publications Sdn. Bhd., 1998
 Martin, Frederick, Keltie, John Scott, Renwick, Isaac Parker Anderson, Epstein, Mortimer, Paxton, John, Steinberg, Sigfrid Henry, The Statesman's Year-book: Statistical and Historical Annual of the States of the World for the Year ; 1978–1979, St. Martin's Press, 1978

External links

 Photo Album: Dalam Kenangan, Utusan Malaysia
 Photo Album: Agong sihat di Singapura, 15 October 2001, Utusan Malaysia

Monarchs of Malaysia
Salahuddin of Selangor 
2001 deaths
Salahuddin
Salahuddin
Salahuddin
Malaysian people of Bugis descent
Marshals of the Royal Malaysian Air Force
Malaysian Muslims
Malaysian people of Malay descent
Alumni of SOAS University of London

Recipients of the Darjah Kerabat Diraja Malaysia

Federated Malay States people
People from British Malaya
20th-century Malaysian politicians
21st-century Malaysian politicians
Recipients of the Order of the Crown of the Realm
First Classes of the Family Order of the Crown of Indra of Pahang
Recipients of the Order of Merit of Malaysia